Eriophyidae is a family of more than 200 genera of mites, which live as plant parasites, commonly causing galls or other damage to the plant tissues and hence known as gall mites. About 3,600 species have been described, but this is probably less than 10% of the actual number existing in this poorly researched family. They are microscopic mites and are yellow to pinkish white to purplish in color. The mites are worm like, and have only two pairs of legs. Their primary method of population spread is by wind. They affect a wide range of plants, and several are major pest species causing substantial economic damage to crops. Some species, however, are used as biological agents to control weeds and invasive plant species.

Notable species
Notable species in this family include:
Abacarus hystrix, the cereal rust mite
Abacarus sacchari, the sugarcane rust mite
Acalitus essigi, the redberry mite, which affects blackberries
Aceria chondrillae, the chondrilla gall mite, an agent of biological control against skeleton weed (Chondrilla juncea)
Aceria guerreronis, a mite of coconuts
Aceria malherbae, the bindweed gall mite, an agent of biological control against field bindweed (Convolvulus arvensis)
Cecidophyopsis ribis, blackcurrant gall mite, important pest of several Ribes
Eriophyes padi, a mite that causes cherry pouch galls on black cherry trees

Selected genera

Abacarus
Aberoptus
Acalitus
Acaphylla
Acaphyllisa
Acaralox
Acarelliptus
Acaricalus
Aceria
Achaetocoptes
Acritonotus
Aculochetus
Aculodes
Aculops
Aculus
Adenoptus
Aequsomatus
Anthocoptes
Bariella
Boczekiana
Brachendus
Calacarus
Calepitrimerus
Callyntrotus
Cecidophyes
Cecidophyopsis
Cisaberiptus
Colomerus
Coptophylla
Cosetacus
Criotacus
Cupacarus
Cymoptus
Dichopelmus
Ditrymacus
Epitrimerus
Eriophyes
Gilarovella
Glyptacus
Keiferella
Leipothrix
Liroella
Mesalox
Metaculus
Monochetus
Neooxycenus
Neotegonotus
Oxycenus
Paraphytoptus
"Pentamerus" Roivainen, 1951 (non Sowerby, 1813: preoccupied)
Phyllocoptes
Phyllocoptruta
Platyphytoptus
Reckella
Shevtchenkella
Stenacis
Tegolophus
Tegonotus
Tegoprionus
Tetra
Tetraspinus
Thamnacus
Tumescoptes
Vasates

References
Digital museum of Nature: Classification of Eriophyoid Mites
Fauna Europaea
 Joel Hallan's Biology Catalog: Eriophyidae

External links

 Acalitus vaccinii, blueberry bud mite on the UF/IFAS Featured Creatures Web site
 Acathrix trymatus, a coconut mite on the UF/IFAS Featured Creatures Web site
 Aceria guerreronis, a coconut mite on the UF/IFAS Featured Creatures Web site

 
Acari families
Agricultural pest mites
Sarcoptiformes